Anal Sex Penis is the debut studio album from Japanese girl group ASP. It was released on May 26, 2021, by WACK and consists of thirteen tracks.

Track listing
All music composed by Kenta Matsukuma.

Charts

References

2021 debut albums
Japanese-language albums